Rarities is the compilation album by a Japanese singer-songwriter Tatsuro Yamashita, released in October 2002. The album is mainly composed of the songs which had initially appeared on B-sides of his previous singles and not included on any albums.

Track listing

Charts

Weekly charts

Year-end charts

Certifications

References

Tatsuro Yamashita albums
2002 greatest hits albums